Kraft is a German surname that means "strength", "power". Notable people with the surname include:

 Adam Kraft (c. 1455–1509), German sculptor
 Antonín Kraft (1749–1820), Czech cellist and composer
 Charles H. Kraft (born 1932), anthropologist
 Christopher C. Kraft, Jr. (1924–2019), NASA flight director
 Eric Kraft (born 1944), American author
 Hannelore Kraft (born 1961), Prime Minister of North Rhine-Westphalia
 Herbert C. Kraft (1927–2000), American archaeologist
 James L. Kraft (1874–1953), founder of Kraft Foods
 Leo Kraft (1922–2014), American composer, author, and educator
 Milan Kraft (born 1980), Czech ice hockey player
 Nina Kraft (1968–2020), German triathlete
 Norbert Kraft (born 1950), Canadian guitarist
 Ole Bjørn Kraft (1893–1980), Danish journalist and politician 
 Patrick Kraft, College athletic director
 Rainer Kraft (born 1974), German politician
 Randy Steven Kraft (born 1945), American serial killer
 Robert Kraft (born 1941), American football executive
 Robert Kraft (astronomer) (1927–2015), American astronomer
 Stefan Kraft (born 1993), Austrian ski jumper
 Thomas Kraft (born 1988), German football player
 Victor Kraft (1880–1975), Austrian  philosopher, member of the Vienna Circle
 William Kraft (1923–2022), American composer

References

German-language surnames
Jewish surnames